St. Benet Biscop Catholic Academy (formerly S. Benet Biscop Catholic High School) is a Roman Catholic high school in Bedlington, Northumberland, England. It is the only Catholic high school in the county.

Patron
Biscop Baducing was born around 628. He served King Oswui of Northumbria as a warrior until 653 when he accompanied St. Wilfrid on a pilgrimage to Rome. He made a second visit with Alcfrith, Oswui's son, when he became a monk and renamed himself Benedict. On his third trip to Rome he returned in 669 with Theodore of Tarsus, the newly appointed archbishop of Canterbury. Theodore appointed him abbot of Sts. Peter and Paul monastery, which is now known as St. Augustine's Canterbury. He founded the monastery at Jarrow, in 682. His last trip to Rome in 685 resulted in the adoption of the Roman script and in many additions to the libraries at Wearmouth and Jarrow,

History
Northumberland used to have a middle school system (three tier) and this was the site of the Catholic upper school. It was reorganised in 2000 and became St Benet Biscop Catholic Voluntary Aided High School. Inspections judged this to be a good school in 2007, 2010 and 2013. It converted to an academy in March 2015 and has since been judged twice in 2016 and 2019 as requiring improvement The 2021 limited remote monitoring inspection reported that the outstanding issues had been addressed.

Description

This is a larger than average Catholic comprehensive school serving a large area of Northumbria. The intake is largely White British with a lower than average number of ethnic minority students, or students from deprived backgrounds or students with special needs.

The principal feeder schools are:
St Aidan's R.C. Primary School, Ashington
St Bede's RCVA Primary School, Bedlington
St Paul's RCVA Primary School, Alnwick
Ss Peter and Paul's Catholic Primary Academy, Cramlington
St Wilfrid's RCVA Primary School, Blyth 

The school consists of two teaching blocks named after saints. In 2020 it was in the midst of a four million pound enlargement and refurbishment which involved securing the perimeter fence, gutting the St Oswald's building and extending the St Wilfrid's block. A new sports hall is being built, which will enable extra sports and co-curricular programmes. Separate, but on the school site is the Lodge.

Academics
Virtually all maintained schools and academies follow the National Curriculum, and are inspected by Ofsted on how well they succeed in delivering a 'broad and balanced curriculum'.

The school operates a two-year, Key Stage 3 where all the core National Curriculum subjects are taught. Year 7 and Year 8 study core subjects:  Religious Education, English, Mathematics, Science. The following foundation subjects are offered: Art & Design, Computing, Technology, Drama, Core Skills, French, Spanish, Geography and History, Music and PE.

In years 9, 10 and 11, in the three-year Key Stage 4, students study a core of Religious Education, English Language and Literature, Mathematics, Science and PE with three options that are studied for five hours a fortnight. These are chosen from a pool that varies each year. In 2019 BTEC Sport, BTEC Children's Play Learning & Development, and GCSE were offered in Drama, French, Spanish, Individual Sciences, IT, Product Design, Food and Nutrition, Health and Social Care, Business Studies, Geography, History, and Music.

Notable alumni
 Jamie McClen, footballer; ex-Newcastle United player

References

External links
Creative students celebrate success with business initiative
Article from the Journal newspaper on Princess Anne's visit to St. Benet Biscop High School
Minsteracres

Catholic secondary schools in the Diocese of Hexham and Newcastle
Secondary schools in Northumberland
Educational institutions established in 1976
1976 establishments in England
Academies in Northumberland
Bedlington